Mount Aureol is a Sierra Leonean football club from Freetown, Sierra Leone. The club is currently a member of the Sierra Leone National Premier League, the highest division of football in Sierra Leone.
Mount Aureol SLIFA, is in The first position on the current Division One League 2020 that is on hold due to the covid 19 pandemic.

Michael Bangura_Umar Kamara newly signed Footballers

Football clubs in Sierra Leone
Sport in Freetown